Fan Pan Tae is a quiz show of Thailand.

Fan Pan Tae is a knowledge-enhancing game of personal interests. The program has become talk of the town shortly since its first broadcast on September 1, 2000. The game was recognized as winner of best game or quiz programme from Asian Television Award in 2003 and 2004. In addition, the show has won multiple awards from many institutions in Thailand.

The game challenges player in all aspects of their passion such as sport, hobby, music, pop culture, famous person, and any knowledge field, etc.  The question will be put to the test to see if you really are the "hard-core fan" (Sud Yord Fan Pan Tae).

Five finalists compete to be the "hard-core fan". The game challenges your memory, quick answer, and ability to solve the puzzle.  The special prize, custom made for each game, makes the contest unique and precious for the winner.  The weekly winner will join the year end challenge for "Fan of the year".

Your heartbeat will go up as you wait for the host to confirm whether you get to the right answer.  The excitement continues throughout the whole hour of the show as challenged, and one of a kind question awaits for answers.

Fan pan tae, a knowledge-enhancing game of personal interests, challenges the contestants' amazing ability and knowledge of their interests.  The program, a phenomenon of Thailand's quiz show, has become a talk of the town shortly since its debut in 2000.  The tremendous excitement makes your breath hold whilst waiting for the host to confirm the right answer.  The game is awarded the winner of the best game or quiz programme from Asian Television Awards in 2003 and 2004, including multiple awards from many institutions in Thailand.  The game challenges contestants in all aspects of their passion, such as, sports, music, history, literature, famous persons, etc.

The competition will find the genuine fan, one out of the 5 contestants.  The first competition involves memorization and spontaneous response in answering the question pictures within 3 seconds.  The next break competes between 2 pairs to find the last two contestants by answering the question from a hint of a given qualification or jigsaw game. The final round lets the last 2 contestants answer the question from a hint of a given qualification to find the last man standing.  In last break, the winner who is able to answer the special question will become “The genuine fan” and receive special unique prizes.  At the end of the year, winners from each telecast will join the year end challenge for the “Fan of the Year” for the grand prize, such as land, house and a brand new car (Toyota Camry in 2007), which is worth more than 4 million bahts.

Fan Pan Tae has been adapted in Sweden by commercial broadcaster TV4, with the local title 'Fantasterna'. The first series aired in 2013 and was produced by Baluba, part of the Nice Entertainment Group.  In early 2015, Sky One in the UK is due to air a local adaptation entitled. 8 x 60 minute episodes will air in primetime on Thursdays at 8pm, the series is produced by Victory Television, who have made changes to the format making each episode a competition being fans with a passion for different subjects. Known as 'The Fan' internationally, Fan Pan Tae is marketing and sold internationally by format sales company, Small World IFT.

Format

Episodes

Season 1 (2000)

Season 2 (2001)

Season 3 (2002)

Season 4 (2003)

Season 5 (2004)

Season 6 (2005)

Season 7 (2006)

Season 8 (2007)

Season 9 (2008)

Season 10 (2012)

Season 11 (2013)

Season 12 (2014)

Season 13 (2015)

Season 14 : Super Fan (2016-17)

Season 15 (2018)

2022 Specials

Fan of the Year (Hard Core Fan)

International versions 
Fanpantae side by side on the International version by Eyeworks (outside Workpoint Entertainment).

Controversy 
Fan Pan Tae, while popular, is repeatedly questioned about its accuracy.  Internet webboard posters, such as in Pantip.com, has proven that the show was giving wrong answers in many occasions.  A more serious allegation claims that the show is giving unfairly advantages to famous contestants, especially those in the show business, over ordinary people who contest in the same topic (anyone can apply to play the game, regardless of their notability.) Another Workpoint's show, Tod Sa Gun Game, is also criticized of fraudulent.
However, all of these errors were corrected, and questions that were given wrong answers never aired on TV. Instead, they were scrapped and played another round, with different questions.

References

External links 
 Official Facebook

Channel 5 (Thailand) original programming
Workpoint TV original programming
Thai game shows
2000 Thai television series debuts
2009 Thai television series endings
2018 Thai television series endings
Television series by Workpoint Entertainment
2012 Thai television series debuts
2000s Thai television series
2010s Thai television series